Kunsthalle Basel is a contemporary art gallery in Basel, Switzerland. As Switzerland's oldest and still most active institution for contemporary art, Kunsthalle Basel forms a vital part of Basel's cultural centre and is located next to the city's theatre, opposite the concert house Stadtcasino, and in the same building as the famed Restaurant Kunsthalle. Curators and directors of the museum have included Jean-Christophe Ammann, Peter Pakesch, and Adam Szymczyk. In November 2014, Los Angeles-born Elena Filipovic was appointed director. The museum also hosts the library of Basler Kunstverein, which holds 30,000 items related to contemporary art, and a photo archive of the museum's history and past exhibits.

History 

In the 1920s and 1930s, before the opening of Kunstmuseum Basel, Kunsthalle Basel was home to and displayed a part of Basel's public art collections. Due to financial issues in the 1950s, there was a time when the building was rented to the state, but, after being renovated in 1969, it was returned to the Kunstverein.

Architecture 

The artists Arnold Böcklin, Karl Brünner (1833-1871), Ernst Stückelberg and Charles Iguel (1826-1897) contributed the architectural adornment of the building. The ground floor of the building was dedicated to serve as an artist's clubhouse (today the Kunsthalle Basel Restaurant).

By 1927, the building had been extended several times to additionally house a workshop for sculptors and a sculpture hall (today the Stadtkino Basel). Between 1969 and 1973, the Kunsthalle underwent its first period of renovation. The library, whose inventory goes back to the founding year of the Kunstverein and today has a focus on contemporary art publications, in 1992 was installed permanently in the rooms of the former caretaker's apartment. In 2004, the Steinberg building underwent further, major renovations executed by the architects  with the intent of both restoring its former glory and simultaneously updating it in an attempt to prolong its relevance in the art and architecture world. During this renovation, the Swiss Architecture Museum S AM moved into the first floor of the building.

Exhibitions
Artists who have had solo exhibitions include:

See also 
Kunsthalle 
Swiss Architecture Museum 
Museums in Basel

References

External links 
Kunsthalle Basel website

Museums in Basel
Modern art museums
Contemporary art galleries in Switzerland
Art galleries established in 1872
1872 establishments in Switzerland